Katrin Krabbe (later Zimmermann; born 22 November 1969) is a German former track and field athlete. She represented East Germany (GDR) at the 1988 Seoul Olympics, and went on to win the 100 metres and 200 metres titles at the 1991 World Championships in Tokyo, representing a unified Germany. Her best times are 10.89 secs for 100m (1988) and 21.95 secs for 200m (1990).

Life and career
Krabbe was a successful track star, winning the 100 m and 200 m titles in the 1990 European Athletics Championships (held in Split) and the same titles at the 1991 World Championships in Athletics (held in Tokyo, where she beat Gwen Torrence and Merlene Ottey). She was also part of the winning 4 × 100 metres relay East German women's team in the European Championships.

In 1992, Krabbe along with teammates Silke Möller and Grit Breuer tested positive for the stimulant clenbuterol. All three athletes were suspended for one year by the German Athletics Federation, but the International Association of Athletics Federations (IAAF) extended this to two years. Krabbe sued the IAAF and received damages (1.2 million DM), while Breuer did not and was able to compete again after the ban. The suspension kept Krabbe from competing in the 1992 Summer Olympics, and effectively ended her athletic career.

Personal bests
100 m – 10.89 +1.8 (Berlin 20 July 1988)

200 m – 21.95 +0.3 (Split 30 August 1990)

Achievements

See also
List of sportspeople sanctioned for doping offences
 German all-time top lists – 100 metres
 German all-time top lists – 200 metres

References

External links

RunnersWeb.com article
Sports Illustrated article

1969 births
Living people
People from Neubrandenburg
Sportspeople from Mecklenburg-Western Pomerania
East German female sprinters
German female sprinters
Doping cases in athletics
German sportspeople in doping cases
Olympic athletes of East Germany
Athletes (track and field) at the 1988 Summer Olympics
World Athletics Championships medalists
European Athletics Championships medalists
World Athletics Championships athletes for Germany
IAAF World Athlete of the Year
World Athletics Championships winners
Olympic female sprinters